Aahat (English: An approaching sound)  is an Indian thriller horror television anthology series created by B. P. Singh for Sony Entertainment Television. The series premiered on 5 October 1995. The episodes of first, second and fifth seasons were half-hourly, while episodes of third, fourth and sixth seasons were one-hourly. Om Puri, Mandira Bedi, Tom Alter, Ashutosh Rana, Shivaji Satam, Virendra Saxena Nivaan Sen and noted theater personality Satyadev Dubey have starred in the show. Canadian actor, Remi Kaler also worked in the series in 1999 and 2000. The sixth season premiered on 18 February 2015, starring Shakti Anand and ended on 4 August 2015.

Plot
The first season was mostly a crime thriller-whodunit with only occasional episodes on the supernatural. After the first season, each story focused on a different aspect of paranormal activity, such as ghosts, zombies, phantoms, undead persons, possessed objects and witches and wizards.

Series overview

Season 1 (1995–2001)
Aahat was first shot in 1994 as a suspense thriller, and began broadcast on 5 October 1995, each story being split across two episodes. The season aired on Thursday nights, later shifting to every Friday nights. After about 40 episodes with the same theme, one episode with a supernatural theme was made and when audiences for the series rose sharply, it made the switch.

Season 2 (2004–2005)
Due to the popularity of the first season, Sony TV decided to bring back the series in its second season. The second season aired on Friday nights. The episode format was same as of the first season. This time the season failed to gain TRP ratings.

Season 3 (2007)
The third season was titled as Aahat: Dahshat Ki Teesri Dastak (English: An approaching sound: The Third Coming of Horror). The season aired on Saturday nights, each story being shown in a single episode. This time too the season didn't manage to gain TRP ratings and the season was shut down soon.

Season 4 (2009–2010)
The fourth season was titled Aahat: The All New Series, which aired on every Friday and Saturday nights. In the season, Durjan, head of Paranormal And Supernatural Activities Research who used to collect powers from the spirits for his boss sends Harsh (Chaitanya Choudhury), Raghav (Vishal Gandhi) and Yamini (Krystle D'Souza) to cope up
with a new supernatural power every week with the story being split into two episodes. The season had three crossover episodes with the series CID. Once in November 2009, second time in February 2010 and third time in June 2010.

{| class="wikitable"
|-
! Episode no. !! Name !! Date of Telecast
|-
| 1 || rowspan=2| Khajan Mail(Crossover episode with CID Episode 592 – Faraar) || 13 November 2009
|-
| 2 || 14 November 2009
|-
| 3 || rowspan=2| The Scarecrow || 20 November 2009
|-
| 4 || 21 November 2009
|-
| 5 || rowspan=2| Sosia Ki Aatma || 27 November 2009
|-
| 6 || 28 November 2009
|-
| 7 || rowspan=2| Bina Sar Wala Aadmi || 4 December 2009
|-
| 8 || 5 December 2009
|-
| 9 || rowspan=2| Bhootiya Haveli || 11 December 2009
|-
| 10 || 12 December 2009
|-
| 11 || rowspan=2| Kabristan || 18 December 2009
|-
| 12 || 19 December 2009
|-
| 13 || rowspan=2| Calling 303 || 25 December 2009
|-
| 14 || 26 December 2009
|-
| 15 || rowspan=2| Maut Ka Khazana || 1 January 2010
|-
| 16 || 2 January 2010
|-
| 17 || rowspan=2| Maut Ke Saat Phere || 8 January 2010
|-
| 18 || 9 January 2010
|-
| 19 || rowspan=2| Maut Ki Roshni || 15 January 2010
|-
| 20 || 16 January 2010
|-
| 21 || rowspan=2| Khooni Joker || 22 January 2010
|-
| 22 || 23 January 2010
|-
| 23 || rowspan=2| Maut Ki Ghadi || 29 January 2010
|-
| 24 || 30 January 2010
|-
| 25 || rowspan=2| Shaitaani Chitrakar || 5 February 2010
|-
| 26 || 6 February 2010
|-
| 27 || rowspan=2| Darr(Crossover episode with CID Episode 606 – Bank Locker Ka Raaz) || 12 February 2010
|-
| 28 || 13 February 2010
|-
| 29 || rowspan=2| Qatilana Daftar || 19 February 2010
|-
| 30 || 20 February 2010
|-
| 31 || rowspan=2| Shaitaani Talab || 26 February 2010
|-
| 32 || 27 February 2010
|-
| 33 || rowspan=2| Maut Ki Jail || 5 March 2010
|-
| 34 || 6 March 2010
|-
| 35 || rowspan=2| Bhediya Aatma || 12 March 2010
|-
| 36 || 13 March 2010
|-
| 37 || rowspan=2| Isse Dekhna Mana Hai || 19 March 2010
|-
| 38 || 20 March 2010
|-
| 39 || rowspan=2| Khooni Haveli || 26 March 2010
|-
| 40 || 27 March 2010
|-
| 41 || rowspan=2| Shaitaani Kapda || 2 April 2010
|-
| 42 || 3 April 2010
|-
| 43 || rowspan=2| Rengti Chudail || 9 April 2010
|-
| 44 || 10 April 2010
|-
| 45 || rowspan=2| Maut Ka Hotel || 16 April 2010
|-
| 46 || 17 April 2010
|-
| 47 || rowspan=2| Atript Aatma || 23 April 2010
|-
| 48 || 24 April 2010
|-
| 49 || rowspan=2| Maut Ke Akshar || 30 April 2010
|-
| 50 || 1 May 2010
|-
| 51 || rowspan=2| Khoon peeney wali Aatma || 7 May 2010
|-
| 52 || 8 May 2010
|-
| 53 || rowspan=2| Khaufnak Siskiyan' || 14 May 2010
|-
| 54 || 15 May 2010
|-
| 55 || rowspan=2| Suno Ek Kahani Maut ki Zubaani || 21 May 2010
|-
| 56 || 22 May 2010
|-
| 57 || rowspan=2| Ulti Ginti || 28 May 2010
|-
| 58 || 29 May 2010
|-
| 59 || rowspan=2| Qatilana Savari || 4 June 2010
|-
| 60 || 5 June 2010
|-
| 61 || rowspan=2| Shaitaani Cartoon || 11 June 2010
|-
| 62 || 12 June 2010
|-
| 63 || rowspan=2| Sote Huey Aatmaon Ko Mat Jagana || 18 June 2010
|-
| 64 || 19 June 2010
|-
| 65 || rowspan=2| Shaitaani Khat(Crossover episode with CID Episode 630 – Kissa Gumnaam Qatil Ka) || 25 June 2010
|-
| 66 || 26 June 2010
|}

Season 5 (2010)
Due to the huge popularity of the fourth season, Sony TV decided to telecast the series four days a week. The fifth season aired on every Monday to Thursday nights. Every week, two stories were telecast, each story being split across two episodes. But this idea didn't take off; the TRP ratings dropped once again and the channel had to shut down the series on 25 November 2010.

To celebrate 15 years of the series, this season featured a 16 - episode arc titled "Maut Ka Khel" (English: "The Game of Death") which aired starting 20 September 2010. This was heavily inspired by the 1999 Hollywood horror film House On Haunted Hill. The storyline follows celebrities (Sidharth Shukla, Roshni Chopra, Aashka Goradia, Vivan Bhatena, Gautam Rode, Ketki Dave, Tanaaz Irani, Bakhtiyaar Irani, Aryan Vaid, Bobby Darling, Karishma Tanna, Sanjeet Bedi and Shahbaz Khan) who lived in a 200-year-old haunted house.

Season 6 (2015)
The first episode of the sixth installation of the series premiered on 18 February 2015. Initially, the series was aired bi-weekly on every Wednesday and Thursday nights. The first episode of the series had gained a TRP rating of 2.9. Due to high ratings, the channel decided to telecast the season four days on every Monday to Thursday nights. But after a couple of weeks, the TRP ratings dropped, and the channel had to shut down the season on 4 August 2015.

Reception

Critical response
The first five seasons of the series received general acclaim but response for the sixth season was quite mixed. Vineeta Kumar of India TV stated, "As against everybody's expectations, Aahat (season 6) doesn't seem that impressive."

Sweta Kaushal of Hindustan Times  stated, "The new episode of Aahat (season 6) does not scare at all and lives up to all the comic cliches that Indian horror shows have been following till date. At best, it is hilarious."

Ratings

Vineeta Kumar of India TV gave the sixth season 2/5 stars, and further stated, "For all those who would be expecting grand with the elements of horror and spook in it, Aahat has come with a slight disappointment."

Sweta Kaushal of Hindustan Times'' giving the same ratings to the sixth season, further stated, "The new episode shows women with bad make-up as the ghosts."

Awards
Fireworks Productions was nominated for Best Continuing TV Programme and for Best Thriller/Horror Show Of The Year of Indian Telly Awards in 2002. Sujit Pattnaik and Tanmoy Ghosh won Indian Television Academy Awards for Best Visual Effects in 2010, while Himanshu, Yogen and Kamal were nominated for the same category of the same award in 2005 and 2012, however, winning in 2011.

References

External links

1995 Indian television series debuts
2000s Indian television series
Hindi-language television shows
Indian horror fiction television series
Sony Entertainment Television original programming
2015 Indian television series endings
Indian anthology television series